The Parachrostiina are a subtribe of moths of the family Erebidae. This clade was described by Michael Fibiger in 2008.

Taxonomy
The subtribe was originally described as the subfamily Parachrostiinae of the family Micronoctuidae.

Clades (former tribes) and genera
Duplex clade
Duplex Fibiger, 2008
Sinochrostia Fibiger, 2010
Parachrostia clade
Parachrostia Fibiger, 2008
Digita Fibiger, 2008
Anellus Fibiger, 2008
Taiwani Fibiger, 2008
Mimachrostia Sugi, 1982

References

Micronoctuini
Lepidoptera subtribes